Naomi Wu, also known as Sexy Cyborg, is a Chinese DIY maker and internet personality. As an advocate of women in STEM, transhumanism, open source hardware, and body modification, she attempts to challenge gender and tech stereotypes with a flamboyant public persona, using objectification of her appearance to inspire women.

Personal life 
Wu was raised as a boy due to the one-child policy in China at the time. She remembers wanting to look like the beautiful ladies who were mistresses of Hong Kong businessmen. She discovered her own gender and sexual identity when she was a teenager. She identifies as a dee lesbian.

Work

Wu's maker projects often center on wearable technology, including cyberpunk clothes and accessories, along with other projects. One of her early designs (2015) was 3D-printed "Wu Ying" (Chinese for "shadowless") platform heels, with a compartment that hides hacker tools including a keystroke recorder, a wireless router, and lock-picking tools. She explained to an interviewer that women's clothing often lacks pockets, but "chunky platform style shoes that many women in China wear to appear taller—have a lot of unused space."

In addition to her public work as a maker, Wu says she also works as a professional coder in Ruby on Rails, using a masculine pseudonym to protect her identity and preclude gender discrimination; she also reviews electronics.

On International Women's Day 2017 she was listed as one of the 43 most influential women in 3D printing, a male-dominated field, by 3D Printer & 3D Printing News. She regards the usage of 3D printing to teach design principles and creativity in the Chinese classroom as the most exciting development of the technology, and more generally regards 3D printing as being the next desktop publishing revolution. She regards "Chinese gadgets" as good as or better than foreign.

In 2013 the Post-Polio Health International (PHI) organizations estimated that there were only six to eight iron lung users in the United States; as of 2017 its executive director knew of none. Press reports then emerged, however, of at least three (perhaps the last three) users of such devices, sparking interest among those in the makerspace community such as Wu (who had never heard of iron lungs before) in the remanufacture of the obsolete components, particularly the gaskets, and prompting discussion of the regulatory and legal issues involved. Wu hoped to achieve a solution with help from her followers on Twitter and YouTube, saying, "Anything from the 50s and 60s, we can whip up in a makerspace, no problem."

On November 5, 2017 Dale Dougherty, the CEO of Maker Media, publisher of Make magazine, doubted Wu's authenticity in a since deleted tweet: "I am questioning who she really is. Naomi is a persona, not a real person. She is several or many people." On November 6, 2017, Dougherty publicly apologized to Wu for "my recent tweets questioning your identity," saying they represented a failure to live up to the inclusivity Make magazine should value. Wu herself considers the matter settled.  Wu appeared on the February/March 2018 cover of Make, which also included an article about her experiences with open source hardware in China. Wu was the first Chinese person ever to appear on the cover of Make.

Vice article 

In 2018, a reporter from Vice spent three days with Wu in Shenzhen, exploring the city, meeting Wu's friends, photographing Wu's home, and describing in depth the local creative history and Wu's recent creation, the Sino:Bit, a single-board microcontroller for computer education in China, and the first Chinese open-source hardware product to be certified by the Open Source Hardware Association.

The article which revealed details of her personal life drew criticism from Wu and from others when according to her agreement with Vice, such details should have been left out of the article, out of fear of retaliation by the Chinese government and also to protect her own private life. Vice refused to comply with the agreement and published the details regardless.

After Vice refused to retract the story, Wu created a video in which she made boots with tiny video screens, which displayed Vice's editor-in-chief's home address. Wu's Patreon account was suspended for doxxing. Wu says this temporarily stalled her independent maker career, and she returned to freelance coding for a brief period of time.

After the Vice article 

In November 2019, Wu was detained by Chinese authorities for an interstitial Wall Street Journal interview exposé piece on Chinese censorship in an episode of Netflix's Patriot Act with Hasan Minhaj.

See also 

 Hacker culture
 Maker culture

References

External links 

 Naomi Wu's channel on YouTube
 Portrayal in DFRobot & China Daily
 NYT Welcome Our New Fembot Overlords (Naomi Wu appears at 2:24)
 Make (magazine)-Vol 61, March 2018 - Cover story about Naomi Wu and other makers from that region.
 Sexy Cyborg FAQ on Pastebin

people from Shenzhen
year of birth missing (living people)
place of birth missing (living people)
living people

DIY culture
hacker culture

Chinese transhumanists
Chinese YouTubers